Georgi Mikhailovich Stabovoi (April 2, 1894 – July 10, 1968) was a Ukrainian/Soviet film director and screenwriter, born in Kozelets.

Filmography
 П.К.П. (Пилсудский купил Петлюру) (P.K.P. (Pilsudski Bought Petliura)) (1926)
 Свежий ветер (Fresh Wind) (1926)
 Два дня (Two Days) (1927)
 Человек из леса (The Man from the Forest) (1928)
 Экспонат из паноптикума (Exhibit of the Panopticon) (1929)
 Жемчужина Семирамиды (Semiramis's Pearl) (1929)
 Шагать мешают (Walking Obstructed) (1930)

References

Soviet film directors
Soviet screenwriters
Male screenwriters
1894 births
1968 deaths
People from Kozelets
20th-century screenwriters